The labiodental ejective fricative is a type of consonantal sound used in some spoken languages.

Features
Features of the labiodental ejective fricative:

Occurrence

Notes

See also
 List of phonetic topics

References
Colarusso, John. 1992. A Grammar of the Kabardian Language. University of Calgary Press.

External links
 

Fricative consonants
Ejectives
Oral consonants